Lisa Kathleen Fitzpatrick is an American infectious disease physician, epidemiologist, and public health expert known for her work on health literacy, health equity, and racial health disparities.

Education
Fitzpatrick earned a B.A. and an M.D. from University of Missouri-Kansas City in 1992. She was a resident at St. Vincent Hospital in Indianapolis, an infectious diseases fellow at the University of Colorado Health Sciences Center, and received a master's degree from the University of California-Berkeley in 2001. In 2015 Fitzpatrick completed a master's degree at the John F. Kennedy School of Government.

Biography
Fitzpatrick's early work was at the Center for Disease Control and Prevention where she specialized in the investigation of tuberculosis and was a diplomat in global health in the Caribbean. She also worked on education of people about HIV/AIDS while she worked in the San Francisco Department of Health and in this context she spoke with the Washington Post about getting people tested for HIV. Her published work in this realm assessed people's thoughts on the medical care they received regarding tuberculosis and health disparities in communities affected by HIV.  Fitzpatrick founded Grapevine Health to improve health literacy and education for under-resourced communities and, as of 2022, she is a lecturer and adjunct professor at George Washington University School of Medicine & Health Sciences and the

Fitzpatrick is known for her work in increasing people's understanding of human health, particularly with respect to personal health. During the COVID-19 pandemic, Fitzpatrick shared her experience with getting vaccinated with other people in order to encourage other people to get vaccinated. She goes by "Dr. Lisa" while presenting outreach, a program where she interacts with people on the street to talk about healthcare. In 2020 Fitzpatrick was named as one of five people who will serve as Joe Biden's committee for healthcare policy, and she is a member of the round table on health literacy group at the National Academies of Science, Engineering, and Medicine.

Selected publications

Awards and honors 
In 2011 the University of Missouri - Kansas City's medical school awarded Fitzpatrick with the E. Grey Dimond Take Wing Award.

References 

Living people
Women physicians
American epidemiologists
University of Missouri–Kansas City alumni
Harvard Kennedy School alumni
University of California, Berkeley alumni
Year of birth missing (living people)